Sumeru is a 2021 Indian Hindi-language film directed by Avinash Dhyani and starring Avinash Dhyani and Sanskriti Bhatt.  The film was shot at various locations in Uttarakhand. The film is scheduled to be released on 1 October 2021.

The film is an innocent love story between Bhavar Pratap Singh (Dhyani) and Savi Malhotra (Bhatt). Ali will be seen in a "small but important role" in this film.

Cast
 Avinash Dhyani as Bhavar Pratap Singh
 Sanskriti Bhatt as Savi Malhotra
 Shagufta Ali as Shamaira

References

External links
 

2021 films
2021 drama films
Hindi-language drama films
Indian drama films
2020s Hindi-language films